Justin Jennings (born October 29, 1992) is an American professional stock car racing driver. He last drove the No. 63 and 36 Chevrolet Silverados for MB Motorsports in the NASCAR Camping World Truck Series. Previously, he competed in the Nationwide Series and the ARCA Racing Series.

Racing career
Jennings started his career in go-karts in 2002, and seven years later, joined the ASA Late Model Series. In 2010, Jennings ran both the ASA Late Model Series and the IMCA Dirt Late Model Series. In 2011, Jennings made his ARCA debut in the No. 28 LG SEEDS Chevrolet Impala for Hixson Motorsports in the Prairie Meadows 200 at Iowa Speedway. Jennings started 28th and finished 19th, 12 laps down.

Jennings made his NASCAR debut at Iowa in the 2012 American Ethanol 200 for MB Motorsports in the Camping World Truck Series with Mike Mittler as crew chief, finishing 31st. Jennings also ran the second American Ethanol 200 fall race, also at Iowa, finishing 20th. Jennings also ran in the Nationwide Series that year, in the U.S. Cellular 250 and OneMain Financial 200, finishing 26th and 32nd, respectively. Returning to MB Motorsports and the Truck Series in 2013, Jennings made his debut on an intermediate track at Kansas Speedway, starting 27th (after qualifying with a lap speed of ) and finishing 18th. Jennings also ran the inaugural Mudsummer Classic at Eldora Speedway, finishing 6th in heat race #5, and was relegated to the last chance qualifier. In the LCQ, Jennings finished 4th, and made the feature, starting in 29th. In the feature, Jennings finished 23rd, two laps behind race winner Austin Dillon.

Personal life
Jennings is a graduate of NASCAR Technical Institute, and currently lives in Moscow Mills, Missouri.

Motorsports career results

NASCAR
(key) (Bold – Pole position awarded by time. Italics – Pole position earned by points standings. * – Most laps led.)

Nationwide Series

Camping World Truck Series

 Season still in progress
 Ineligible for series points

ARCA Racing Series
(key) (Bold – Pole position awarded by qualifying time. Italics – Pole position earned by points standings or practice time. * – Most laps led.)

References

External links
 

Living people
1992 births
People from La Grange, Missouri
Racing drivers from Missouri
NASCAR drivers
ARCA Menards Series drivers